The United Democratic Sabah Peoples Power Party (abbreviated SETIA) was a political party in Malaysia. It changed its name to Malaysian United People's Party (MUPP) or Parti Bersatu Sasa Malaysia (BERSAMA) after it extends to Peninsular Malaysia on 23 March 2011.

General election result

See also
Malaysian United People's Party (MUPP) or Parti Bersatu Sasa Malaysia (BERSAMA)

References

Defunct political parties in Sabah
Political parties established in 1994
Political parties disestablished in 2011
1994 establishments in Malaysia
Ethnic political parties
Indigenist political parties